Emamzadeh Ali (also Romanized as Emāmzādeh ‘Alī; also known as Emāmzādeh ‘Alī Farīm) is a village in Farim Rural District, Dodangeh District, Sari County, Mazandaran Province, Iran. At the 2006 census, its population was 127, in 40 families.

References 

Populated places in Sari County